Jadwiga Abramson (17 February 1887 – 1944) was a child psychologist born and raised in Poland, and educated in France.

Biography 
Abramson attended the University of Paris, to pursue her medical degree. Staying in Paris, she began her career in neuropsychiatry at the Clinic of Pediatric Neuro-Psychiatry, where she was appointed the chief of psychology.

She was the co-founder in 1925, with Dr. Georges Heuyer (1884-1977), of the Clinic of Pediatric Neuro-Psychiatry in Paris. She died around 1944.

Selected publications

Journals 

 Abramson, J. (1920). Recherches sur les fonctions mentales de l'enfant à l'âge scolaire. Des services que peuvent rendre les examens psychologiques pour la connaissance d'une classe [L'Année psychologique]  22  pp. 184–220
 Abramson, J., M. JADWIGA, and H. KOPP. "L'echelle métrique du developppement de la motricité chez l'enfant et chez l'adolescent par N. Oseretsky; traduite et adaptée." L'Hygyène Mentale 31 (1936): 53-75.

Books 

L'enfant et l'adolescent instables études cliniques et psychologiques by Jadwiga Abramson
 L'enfant et l'adolescent instables by Jadwiga Abramson (1940)
 Notes sur quelques corrélations psycho-motrices chez les écoliers normaux by Jadwiga Abramson, and Suzanne Le Garrec (1937)
 L'Hygiène mentale de l'enfant en Allemagne. Rééducation et orientation professionnelle, by Jadwiga Abramson by Jadwiga Abramson (1931)
 Sur l'organisation de l'enseignement sélectif. Le système de Gary, by Mlle Jadwiga Abramson by Jadwiga Abramson (1928)
 Le profil mental de l'enfant by Jadwiga Abramson
 Quelques pratiques de rééducation des anormaux à l'âge scolaire by Jadwiga Abramson
 Notes sur le mouvement psychotechnique en Allemagne by Jadwiga Abramson
 Le Profil mental dans l'examen des jeunes délinquants, by Dr. Georges Heuyer et Jadwiga Abramson (1931)
 Sur l'organisation de l'enseignement sélectif : le système de Gary by Jadwiga Abramson
 Les Aptitudes intellectuelles spéciales chez les instables : Extrait des annales Médico-Psychologiques by Jadwiga Abramson
 Sur l'organisation de l'enseignement primaire sélectif en Allemagne by Jadwiga Abramson
 L'Oeuvre de rééducation intellectuelle et morale en Belgique, by Jadwiga Abramson et Hélène Kopp (1932)
 Psycholopathologie expérimentale comparée entre les séquelles d'encéphalite épidémique et les perversions constitutionnelles chez les enfants, by Dr. J. Roubinovitch et Jadwiga Abramson (1928)

References

1887 births
1940s deaths

Year of death uncertain
University of Paris alumni
Polish emigrants to France
French psychologists
French women psychologists
Polish women psychologists
Neuropsychologists
20th-century psychologists
20th-century French women